The House of Representatives, or Pratinidhi Sabha, is the one of the houses of the Federal Parliament of Nepal, with the other house being the National Assembly. Members of the House of Representatives are elected through a parallel voting system. They hold their seats for five years or until the body is dissolved by the President on the advice of the council of ministers. The house meets at the International Convention Centre in Kathmandu.

The House has 275 members; 165 elected from single-member constituencies by first-past-the-post voting and 110 elected through proportional electoral system where voters vote for political parties, considering the whole country as a single election constituency. The House of Representatives, unless dissolved, continues to operate for five years from the date appointed for its first meeting. However, in a state of emergency, the term of the House of Representatives may be extended, not exceeding one year in accordance with federal law.

The current House of Representatives was elected by the general elections held on 20 November 2022, and its first session convened on 9 January 2023.

History

Parliament of Kingdom of Nepal, 1959–1962 
The 1959 constitution of the Kingdom of Nepal, proclaimed on 12 February 1959, first mentions the Pratinidhi Sabha first as follows: "There shall be a Parliament which shall consist of His Majesty and two Houses, to be known respectively as the Senate (Maha Sabha) and the House of Representatives (Pratinidhi Sabha)" (Article No. 18, Constitution of the Kingdom of Nepal, 1959).

The 1959 constitution was abrogated on 16 December 1962 when the new Constitution of the Kingdom of Nepal, 1962 was proclaimed and the parliament of the kingdom became unicameral.

Post-Panchayat, 1990–2002 
The House of Representatives was first provided for by the "Constitution of the Kingdom of Nepal 1990", which replaced the former panchayat system of parliament with a bicameral parliament. It consisted of 205 members directly elected from single member constituencies. It had five-year terms, but it could be dissolved by the King on the advice of the Prime Minister before the end of its term.

Dissolution, 2002–2007 

In May 2002, the House of Representatives was dissolved by King Gyanendra on advice of the then prime minister, Sher Bahadur Deuba, in order to hold new elections. Elections could not take place due to the ongoing civil war, which eventually led King Gyanendra to stage a royal coup. Following the democracy movement of 2006, the King reinstated the earlier legislature. On 15 January 2007, the House of Representatives was transformed into an Interim legislature. This consisted of members appointed under an agreement between the Seven Party Alliance and the Communist Party of Nepal (Maoist) (known by the name Communist Party of Nepal (Maoist Centre), since 2009).

Federal Parliament of Nepal, 2015–present 
The Constitution of Nepal was drafted by the 2nd Constituent Assembly and the provision for a bicameral legislature was re-adopted. The House of Representatives became the lower house of the Federal Parliament of Nepal and its first election was held in 2017.

Members 
The composition and powers of the house are established by Parts 8 and 9 of the Constitution of Nepal. The qualifications for becoming a member of the House are laid out in Article 87 of the Constitution and House of Representatives Election Act, 2017. Members must be :
 a citizen of Nepal
 twenty five years or older on date of nomination
 without a criminal offense conviction involving moral turpitude
 not disqualified by any federal law
 not hold any office of profit (paid by the government).
In addition to this, no member can be a member of both the House of Representatives and the National Assembly.

Vacation of seat 
The seat of a member of House of Representatives may be considered vacant in the following circumstances:
 Written resignation to the Speaker,
 Unable to comply to Article 91,
 Expired term of office / house,
 Unclarified / uninformed absence for ten consecutive house sessions,
 Resignation / removal from the party to which the candidate was associated during election,
 Death.

Current membership

Composition by province

Officers of the House of Representatives

Terms of the House of Representatives

See also 
Rashtriya Sabha
Rastriya Panchayat
Elections in Nepal
Parliament of Nepal

References 

1990 establishments in Nepal
Government of Nepal
History of Nepal (1951–2008)
Parliament of Nepal
National lower houses